In the run up for the 2022 Swedish general election to the Riksdag, various organisations carry out opinion polling to gauge voting intention in Sweden. Results of such polls are displayed in this article.

The date range for these opinion polls are from the 2018 Swedish general election, held on 9 September, to the present day. The next election took place on 11 September 2022.

Opinion polls

Political parties

Vote share

Seat distribution

Graphical summary

Political parties

Seat projection 
There are 349 seats in total – 175 needed for a majority.Parties are denoted with en dashes (–) if no indication is given of their level in polls.

Regional polling
Opinion polls for the general election in Sweden's regions and municipalities.

Stockholm municipality

Political Parties

Vote share in regional election

Stockholm County
Excludes the Municipality of Stockholm.

Vote share in regional election

Gothenburg municipality

Vote share in regional election

West Sweden
Includes the counties of Västra Götaland and Halland but excludes the municipality of Gothenburg.

Vote share in regional election

Greater Malmö

Vote share in regional election

Southern Sweden
Includes the counties of Blekinge and Scania but excludes Greater Malmö.

Vote share in regional election

Småland and the islands
Includes the counties of Gotland, Jönköping, Kalmar and Kronoberg, i.e., Småland, Gotland and Öland.

Vote share in regional election

Gotland
Gotland individually.

Vote share in regional election

Eastern Central Sweden
Includes the counties of Södermanland, Uppsala, Västmanland, Örebro and Östergötland.

Vote share in regional election

Södermanland
Södermanland individually.

Vote share in regional election

Uppsala County
Uppsala County individually.

Vote share in regional election

Västmanland
Västmanland individually.

Vote share in regional election

Northern Central Sweden
Includes the counties of Dalarna, Gävleborg and Värmland.

Vote share in regional election

Northern Sweden
Includes the counties of Jämtland, Norrbotten, Västerbotten and Västernorrland.

Vote share in regional election

Municipal polling
Polling for the municipal elections.

Graphical summary

Vote share

Stockholm municipality

Political parties

Vote share in municipal election

Gothenburg municipality

Vote share in municipal election

Malmö municipality

Vote share in municipal election

Preferred mayor

Uppsala municipality

Vote share in municipal election

Lund municipality

Vote share in municipal election

Sölvesborg municipality

Vote share in municipal election

Leadership polling

Approval ratings

Graphical summary

Share

Preferred prime minister

See also 
Opinion polling for the 2014 Swedish general election
Opinion polling for the 2018 Swedish general election

Notes

References

External links 
List of polls on pollofpolls.se 
List of polls and aggregation on val.digital 
Sifo 
Novus 
Ipsos 
SKOP 
SCB 
Demoskop 
Inizio 
Sentio 

Opinion polling in Sweden